The 1967–68 Iraq Central FA Premier League was the 20th season of the Iraq Central FA League (the top division of football in Baghdad and its neighbouring cities from 1948 to 1973). Eight teams competed in the tournament, which was played in a single round-robin format rather than a double round-robin format, so each team only played each other once, and it started on 16 November 1967.

Aliyat Al-Shorta won the league title for the first time. Maslahat Naqil Al-Rukab player Adel Ibrahim was the league's top scorer with five goals.

League table

Results

References

External links
 Iraqi Football Website

Iraq Central FA League seasons
Iraq
1967 in Iraqi sport
1968 in Iraqi sport